Mikhail Valentinovich Trukhlov (born 13 October 1969 in Rybinsk) is a former Russian football player.

References

1969 births
People from Rybinsk
Living people
Soviet footballers
Russian footballers
FC Tekstilshchik Kamyshin players
Russian Premier League players
FC Arsenal Tula players
FC Dynamo Stavropol players
FC Khimik-Arsenal players
Association football forwards
Sportspeople from Yaroslavl Oblast